The Cib is a right tributary of the river Băcâia in Romania. It flows into the Băcâia in the village Băcâia.

References

Rivers of Hunedoara County
Rivers of Alba County
Rivers of Romania